Destiny is a 1915 American silent drama film directed by Edwin Carewe and starring Emily Stevens, George Le Guere and Walter Hitchcock.

Cast
 Emily Stevens as Mary Gadman 
 George Le Guere as The Boy 
 Walter Hitchcock as The Connoisseur 
 Theodore Babcock as Standish 
 Fred Stone as Parishioner 
 Howard Truesdale as Father Anthony 
 Henri Bergman as Avarice 
 Effingham Pinto as Lust 
 Del DeLois as Rum 
 Florence Short as Passion 
 Vivien Oakland as Beauty 
 Ralph Austin as The Neighbor 
 Edwin Martin as Father Time / Death 
 Baby Field as Baby

References

Bibliography
 Darby, William. Masters of Lens and Light: A Checklist of Major Cinematographers and Their Feature Films. Scarecrow Press, 1991.

External links
 

1915 films
1915 drama films
1910s English-language films
American silent feature films
Silent American drama films
Films directed by Edwin Carewe
American black-and-white films
Metro Pictures films
Films produced by B. A. Rolfe
1910s American films